Edward Nothnagle (November 20, 1866 – February 14, 1938) was an American politician from Pennsylvania who served as a Republican member of the Pennsylvania House of Representatives for Delaware County from 1926 to 1936.

Early life
Nothnagle was born in Chester, Pennsylvania to William and Barbara Weis Nothnagle and was educated in the public schools.

Career
Nothnagle worked as a painter and decorator.  He was elected to the Chester city council.

He was elected to the Pennsylvania House of Representatives for Delaware County by special election on January 5, 1926 to serve the remainder of the 1925 term after the resignation of Walter H. Craig.  He was sworn into office on January 13, 1926 and served 5 consecutive terms until 1936.  He was not a candidate for reelection to the House for the 1937 term.

He died in Chester, Pennsylvania and is interred at the Chester Rural Cemetery.

Personal life
He was married to Margaret Goff.  He was a member of the Freemasons Chester Lodge #236, Woodmen of the World and the Elks.

References

1866 births
1938 deaths
20th-century American politicians
American Freemasons
Burials at Chester Rural Cemetery
Republican Party members of the Pennsylvania House of Representatives
Pennsylvania city council members
People from Chester, Pennsylvania